RV Petrel, or R/V Petrel (IMO: 9268629, MMSI: 235102789), is a  research vessel owned by the estate of Microsoft co-founder Paul Allen. The ship is named after the sea bird petrel. In 2016, Allen purchased the offshore service vessel formerly named Seven Petrel from Subsea 7, a subsea engineering, construction, and services company. In 2017, the ship completed an extensive retrofitting to become a deep-submergence research vessel. It is the only privately owned vessel in the world equipped to explore  depths. It also serves as a testing bed for new deep-sea equipment that has never been deployed on any other ship.

Philanthropy 
The primary mission of the ship, which is fully funded by Allen's estate, is to explore historically significant wrecks at challenging depths and conditions. A precondition set by Allen is for discovered wrecks to be respected as war graves and their locations kept secret, but known to only national governments and museums. In the PBS documentary USS Indianapolis Live from the Deep, Allen said, "We've done a number of these explorations to try to find sunken warships. We try to do these both as really exciting examples of underwater archaeology and as tributes to the brave men [who] went down on these ships." Petrel, while at dock, sometimes conducts walking tours and serves as an educational platform for students and children. Petrels other mission profile includes hosting scientific projects under Allen's mother company, Vulcan Inc.

Collaborative work 
RV Petrel coordinates all its exploration with different organizations around the world. For United States Navy wrecks, Petrel collaborates with the Naval History and Heritage Command. In the Philippines, the crew works with the National Museum and the Battle of Surigao Strait Memorial Council. In 2018, Petrel worked with Australian National Maritime Museum to explore . Robert Kraft, who serves as subsea director for Allen, and Paul Mayer, Petrels lead researcher, traveled to Japan to hand over ROV video of Imperial Japanese Navy wrecks to the Yamato Museum.

Crew
Before Petrel, the project crew was aboard Allen's  operating the megayacht's manned-submersible Pagoo, Argus 3000 remotely operated vehicle (ROV) and Bluefin 12D autonomous underwater vehicle (AUV).

The 20 marine crew and 10 project crew work on 12-hour shifts aboard Petrel. The project crew consists of Kraft the expedition leader, Mayer as lead researcher, four ROV pilots and technicians, one AUV specialist, one multibeam surveyor, one videographer, and one systems support engineer.

For each expedition, Petrel invites local historians, scientists, and observers to complement the project crew.

Crew expeditions in 2015 aboard Octopus

Ironbottom Sound expedition 
The team, while on board Octopus, mapped  of Ironbottom Sound in January 2015, identified 29 wreck locations, seven wreck debris fields, and several possible plane locations. The identification using the sonar imagery with vessel measurements and historical records is pending confirmation by ROV exploration. The remaining 12 wreck locations were not identified during the expedition and require further study.

Musashi 
This discovery made news headlines around the world.

HMS Hood bell recovery 
In August 2015, the team recovered the bell of  after obtaining license from the UK Ministry of Defense. The recovery of the bell was performed upon the request of the HMS Hood Association. Only three of HMS Hoods crew survived and it was the wish of one of them to recover ship's bell as a memorial to shipmates. The bell from HMS Hood was unveiled by the Princess Royal on 24 May 2016 to mark the 75th anniversary of the Royal Navy's largest loss of life (1,415 sailors) from a single vessel.

Malta wreck mapping 

While on board Octopus, the project crew deployed a Bluefin 12D AUV and mapped  of seabed around Malta in September 2015. Sonar images of shipwrecks, several aircraft, torpedoes, and debris field were captured by the AUV.

Ship details
Following the Musashi discovery and the Hood expedition in 2015, Allen bought Petrel in 2016 to become a dedicated research and exploration platform. After a 2016–2017 retrofit, Petrel is now equipped with state-of-the-art technology and the latest systems integration to allow deep-sea search. The vessel now has a  depth-capable ROV, an AUV, and a multibeam echo-sounder. It also has dynamic positioning capability that allows the vessel to stay in station for ROV operations.

Argus 6000 ROV 
RV Petrel has an Argus 80 kW/107HP free-flying work-class ROV with a  payload capability, and has these features: 750 kg horizontal thrust; station-hold facility; sonar feature-based navigation mode; various manipulator configurations from two Schilling T4s; one Schilling Orion 7P; one Rigmaster 5 function; zip pump; sticky feet;  jaws of life; and a 38-mm Webtool with intensifier. She is tethered with an armored 17-mm-thick cable. Recently, the ROV was mounted with an R2Sonic MBES.

Remus 6000 AUV 
It is the only privately owned REMUS 6000 AUV in the world.

Multibeam echosounder 
The echosounder (MBES) package aboard RV Petrel consists of one Kongsberg EM710 hull-mounted multibeam system, one Kongsberg EA600 hull-mounted singlebeam system, one ROV-mounted BlueView M450 2D multibeam imaging sonar, and one EdgeTech 2205 AUV-mounted sidescan array (75/230 kHz with interometric bathymetry). A R2Sonic MBES was recently added to Petrels ROV.

DP2 Class 
RV Petrels electric motors enable it to hold station over a wreck. She has four DGPS, one HiPAP 502, one HiPAP 102, two SeaPath 200, two Standard Gyro, and one fanbeam. She is classified as a Dynamic Positioning Vessel 2.

Power and propulsion 
The ship has four Mitsubishi S16R-MPTK diesel engines, totaling  and driving four ABB AMG 500M4 auxiliary electric generators, generating .

Petrel expeditions in 2017

Artigliere 
Petrel found the Italian Regia Marina World War II destroyer  in March 2017.

USS Indianapolis 
Petrel found  in August 2017. The discovery became headline news around the world and introduced Petrel as Paul Allen's newest addition to his expedition fleet. Kraft said of the elusive Indianapolis, "We did 18 search grids, each one is about a 120 square kilometers and that took us the course of a couple of months. It was about 26 days of searching."

The Indianapolis wreck is upright with her hull and armaments intact and well preserved in the depth. Her bow number 35 was seen by the ROV. Rusticles or oxidized wrought iron were found by the crew emerging from one of the main guns of the ship.

Surigao Strait 
After discovering USS Indianapolis, Petrel sailed to Surigao City in October 2017 to participate in the 73rd commemoration of the Battle of Surigao Strait. Each one was investigated by the ship's ROV and an onboard local historian confirmed the identity of the wreck.

Ormoc Bay and USS Ward 
The discovery of the wreck of USS Ward was a central theme for the 76th commemoration of the Attack on Pearl Harbor on 7 December.

Petrel expeditions in 2018

Return to Ormoc Bay 
In early January 2018, Petrel returned to Ormoc Bay and dived one of the Yūgumo-class destroyers found in 2017. Based on the  guns and armament configuration, she was identified to be . The convoy was attacked by aircraft from Task Force 38 in the Battle of Ormoc Bay. Petrel and Octopus also dove their manned submersible Pagoo on USS Cooper.

C-2A Greyhound in the Philippine Sea 

USS Lexington in the Coral Sea 
On 4 March 2018, Petrel explored the Coral Sea and discovered the wreck of the aircraft carrier , which sank during the Battle of the Coral Sea.

USS Juneau 
On 17 March 2018, Petrel located the wreck of the antiaircraft light cruiser .

USS Helena 
On 11 April 2018, Petrel located the wreck of the light cruiser . Helena was sunk during the Battle of Kula Gulf in 1943 by three torpedoes fired from a Japanese destroyer with a loss of 168 of her crew.

HMAS AE1 
The Royal Australian Navy's submarine , which was lost at sea with all hands on 14 September 1914, and only discovered in December 2017 on the seafloor off the Duke of York Islands in Papua New Guinea (PNG), was visited by Petrels ROV. Petrels crew devised a close-up camera to view details inside the torpedo tube and engine telegraph. This exploration published on 23 April 2018, was supervised by Find AE1 Ltd in partnership with the Australian National Maritime Museum, the Royal Australian Navy, Curtin University, the Western Australian Museum, and the Submarine Institute of Australia. The approval for the survey was granted by Papua New Guinea National Museum and Art Gallery.

Petrel expeditions in 2019

Niizuki 
While the wreck was heavily damaged, her mast is still attached and complete. Niizukis discovery is also noteworthy as the photos of the wreck are the first photos of the ship to exist; no photos of her in service are known to have been taken.

Jintsū 
In February 2019, the 's wreckage was discovered by Petrel near the mouth of Kula Gulf in the Solomon Islands. Her bow section is lying on its port side and the stern section is upright.

Hiei 
Hiei is the fourth Japanese battleship found by Petrels crew.

USS Hornet
She is in remarkably good condition. She sits right-side up with her island still in place. A portion of her flight deck has collapsed due to the fire that raged on her decks during the battle. A portion of her stern is torn away, but the hull remains mostly intact. Several aircraft are scattered among the wreck.

USS Strong
She rests in pieces, the largest of which is the heavily damaged forward section of the ship laying on its port side. The rest of the ship was largely fragmented by the detonation of her depth charges and lies in a compact debris field that includes the ship's boilers, propellers, and wheelhouse.

USS Wasp
The ship sits upright, though appears to have broken in two places, just forward and just aft of the island, apparently on impact with the seabed. The island itself is still in place, though the funnel structure was ripped off during the sinking. Several aircraft were also found in the debris field, including Dauntlesses and Avengers.

Furutaka 

Maya 
On 1 July 2019, it was announced that the wreck of the  had been found off the coast of the Philippine island of Palawan. She is mostly intact, with the exception of her forward bow, which broke off and is lying upside down just astern of the rest of the ship. Her bridge and guns are also intact.

Mogami
On 9 September 2019, it was announced that the wreck of the  had been found in the Bohol Sea. She lies mostly intact, with the exception of her forward bow, which has been blown off, but lying nearby.

USS St. Lo
On 10 October 2019, it was announced that the wreck of the escort carrier, the first ship to have been sunk by a kamikaze, had been discovered on 25 May. She sits upright relatively intact, with notable battle damage. She is the first escort carrier to have been found.

Kaga
She is the first Japanese aircraft carrier to have been found.

Akagi 
On 20 October 2019, the director of undersea operations Rob Kraft and Naval History and Heritage Command historian Frank Thompson aboard Petrel identified the wreck of the  using high-frequency sonar. It is reported that the wreck is upright, on its keel and is largely intact. Due to damage sustained by the ROV during recovery from the preceding survey of Kaga, and a number of other factors, Petrel was unable to conduct a photographic survey of Akagi.

Chōkai

USS Johnston
On 30 October 2019, it was announced that the wreckage of a destroyer believed to be  was located. Her identity was confirmed on 31 March 2021, when the submersible DSV Limiting Factor of Caladan Oceanic surveyed and photographed the deeper main wreck. The visible hull number, 557, confirmed the identity of the ship as Johnston.

MV Doña Paz and MT Vector
On 19 December 2019, it was announced that Petrel had located and surveyed the wrecks of the Philippine ferry,  and the oil tanker . Both wrecks sit straight side up and are in good condition.

University of Hawaii's lost ROV Luu'kai
The drone had broken its tether and was lost on the ocean floor on 20 July 2019. To retrieve Luu'kai, the team lowered a lift elevator and Petrels ROV worked on the recovery procedure. Luu'kai was recovered by the joint team on 29 August 2019.

Petrel expeditions in 2020

Deep Argo floats in the Atlantic Ocean
After finding Kaga and Akagi, Petrel crossed the Pacific in the fourth quarter of 2019 and stationed in the Atlantic Ocean to launch Deep Argo floats beginning January 2020. Through several weeks in January 2020, in the Brazil Basin of the Atlantic, Petrel and National Oceanic and Atmospheric Administration (NOAA) deployed a number of standard Navis floats (2000-m profiles), and deep SOLO floats (6000-m profiles).

As part of the Deep Argo project, a multiyear partnership between the NOAA Pacific Marine Environmental Laboratory (NOAA PMEL) and the Paul G. Allen Family Foundation, the project aimed for a final deployment of Deep Argo floats aboard Petrel. The Foundation committed $4 million to NOAA to help implement the Deep Argo effort.

Full ocean multi-beam and sub bottom-profiler 
In June 2020, Petrel had a Kongsberg EM124 1°x2° full ocean MBES installed. A sub-bottom profiler, a Kongsberg SBP 29 6° system, was also installed on the ship. Both were tested in the Atlantic Ocean, giving detailed bathymetry readings from  depths.

Long-term moorage 
On 11 June 2020, Petrel announced on its Facebook page that it was going to be moored indefinitely. The announcement read, "The impact of the COVID-19 crisis has changed the world for the long term in ways that we never could have imagined. As a result of operational challenges from the pandemic, R/V Petrel will be placed into long-term moorage and she will not be deployed for the foreseeable future. We were tasked with a monumental mission — discover, educate, and honor — and we’re hopeful we will eventually be back in service." Robert Kraft, subsea director, said, "I am proud of the successful Petrel missions that have brought information and closure to so many families and friends of WWII heroes. I am hopeful that Petrel will eventually be back in service, supporting the collection of ocean data and science."

After a drydocking in Florida, Petrel sailed for Leith, Scotland, on 16 August 2020 and arrived on 3 September 2020. As of May 2022, she remains in port.

References

External links

 

2002 ships
Research vessels of the United Kingdom
Ships built by Fincantieri
Ships built in Norway